Yeafesh Osman (born 1 May 1946) is a Bangladeshi architect and politician who is the current minister of science and technology of Government of Bangladesh. He worked under Fazlur Rahman Khan, the notable architect of Sears Tower.

Early life and education
Osman was born in Chittagong in 1946 to novelist Shawkat Osman. His brother Bulbon Osman is an artist and writer. He studied in Chittagong Muslim High School and later passed his Secondary School Certificate and Higher Secondary School Certificate examinations from Siddheswari Boys' High School and Notre Dame College, Dhaka respectively. He completed his graduation in architecture from Bangladesh University of Engineering and Technology.

Career
Osman was elected as the vice president of the Engineering University Central Students' Union in 1970. He got involved in politics as a member of Bangladesh Chhatra League. Later, he joined Awami League and became its Science and Technology Secretary. Osman was a freedom fighter who fought in sector 2 during the Bangladesh Liberation War of 1971.

Osman served as an architect in Housing and Settlement Department, Government of Bangladesh from May 1972 to April 1974 and also worked as a junior Architect under Fazlur Rahman Khan from October 1970 to April 1972. He was the founder Secretary of Institute of Architects Bangladesh. During his professional practice, worked as the Managing Director of Prakalpa Upadeshta Ltd, an architecture and engineering consultancy firm.

Osman was appointed as the State Minister of Science and Technology in 2014 and then became cabinet minister on 14 July 2015.

Osman has published two books, Bongo Amar Janani Amar and Noshto Kal Koshto Kal.

References

Living people
1946 births
Bangladeshi architects
Awami League politicians
Bangladesh University of Engineering and Technology alumni
State Ministers of Science and Technology (Bangladesh)
Science and Technology ministers of Bangladesh
Notre Dame College, Dhaka alumni